Maria Rebelo (divorced Rebelo-Lelut; born 29 January 1956 in Ílhavo, Baixo Vouga, Portugal) is a retired female long-distance runner from France. She set her personal best of 2:29:04 hours in the marathon in 1991.

Rebelo rose to prominence in the 1986 season by winning the Paris Marathon in the time of 2:32:16. Winner of her first national marathon title  in 1990, Maria Rebelo took third at the 1990 European Championships at Split, finishing behind the Portuguese Rosa Mota and the Soviet Valentina Yegorova. She ran the best performance of her career on 21 April 1991 by completing the London Marathon in 2:29:04, then she placed fifth at the 1991 World Championships at Tokyo in 2:32:05. Selected to run at the 1992 Olympic Games, Rebelo did not finish. She won two more French national marathon championships in 1993 and 1994.

International competitions

Road race wins
Paris Marathon: 1986 (2:32:16)
Paris Half Marathon: 1993 (1:13:02)

References

External links
 

1956 births
Living people
People from Ílhavo
French female long-distance runners
French female marathon runners
Olympic athletes of France
Athletes (track and field) at the 1988 Summer Olympics
Athletes (track and field) at the 1992 Summer Olympics
European Athletics Championships medalists
World Athletics Championships athletes for France
Portuguese emigrants to France
Paris Marathon female winners